Rainer Frimmel (born 11 July 1971 in Vienna) is an Austrian director and photographer. After studying psychology in Vienna he graduated as a photographer. He has received scholarships in New York City, Paris and Rome for his photographic work.

Since 1996 he has been working together with Tizza Covi on films, theatre, and photography.

With Tizza Covi

In 2002 Frimmel and Covi founded their own film production company Vento Film to produce their films independently.

They have won several awards for their documentaries, including the Wolfgang-Staudte-Award at the Berlinale for Babooska.

La Pivellina is their first fiction feature film and has been screened worldwide in more than 130 International Film Festivals. The film has received numerous international awards including the Europa Cinemas Label in Cannes and was selected as the Austrian entry for the Best Foreign Language Film at the 83rd Academy Awards, but didn't make the final shortlist.
Their second feature film, The shine of day, premiered in the international competition in Locarno 2012 and won the Silver Leopard for Best Actor.
The film was also awarded as Best Austrian Movie of the year at the Diagonale, and won the Max Ophüls Award in Saarbrücken 2013.

Filmography
2022 Vera
2020 Notes from the Underworld
2016 Mister Universo
2012 Der Glanz des Tages (The shine of day)
2009   La Pivellina
2005   Babooska
2001   Das ist alles  (That’s all)
2000   Aufzeichnungen aus dem Tiefparterre (Notes from the basement)

References

External links
 Austrian Film Commission: Interview with Tizza Covi and Rainer Frimmel about La Pivellina
 indieWire: New Directors/New Films '10 - Directing Duo on the Documentary Approach They Took to “La Pivellina”
Variety: Austria makes Oscar choices
The Hollywood Reporter: La Pivellina - Film Review

Living people
1971 births
Austrian photographers
Austrian film directors
Film people from Vienna